The 2011 BBC Sports Personality of the Year Award, presented on 22 December, was the 58th presentation of the BBC Sports Personality of the Year Awards. Awarded annually by the British Broadcasting Corporation (BBC), the main titular award honours an individual's British sporting achievement over the past year, with the winner selected by public vote from a 10-person shortlist. Other awards presented include team, coach, and young personality of the year.

Award process
The shortlist of ten sportspeople, which was drawn up by "a range of sports experts from newspapers and magazines across the UK", was announced on 29 November 2011. The shortlist was widely criticised for its lack of any female competitors. On 14 December, the British Olympic Association said that they were considering a boycott of the award ceremony in protest.  The BOA chief executive, Andy Hunt, said that he would have included  swimmers Keri-Anne Payne and Rebecca Adlington, rower Katherine Grainger, and England women's cricket captain, Charlotte Edwards, in his top 10. The BBC said that it would review the nomination procedure for the 2012 awards.

The award ceremony was held on Thursday 22 December at the dock10 in Salford, and was broadcast live on BBC One. The winner, decided by a public telephone vote during the ceremony, was Mark Cavendish.

Nominees
The nominees and their achievements in 2011 as described by the BBC and their share of the votes cast were as follows:

Other awards
In addition to the main award as "Sports Personality of the Year", several other awards were also announced:

 Team of the Year: England cricket team
 Coach of the Year:  Andy Flower
 Overseas Personality:  Novak Djokovic
 Young Personality: Lauren Taylor (Golf)
 Unsung Hero Award: Janice Eaglesham and Ian Mirfin (Athletics coaches)
 Lifetime Achievement: Sir Steve Redgrave
 Helen Rollason Award:  Bob Champion

In Memoriam

Severiano Ballesteros
Jimmy Adamson
Peter Roebuck
Alec Weekes 
Michael Jarvis
Sócrates
Betty Callaway
Alex Hay
Richard Butcher
Len Killeen
Ted Lowe
Samuel Wanjiru
Neil Young
Nat Lofthouse
Dan Wheldon
Eddie Turnbull
Joe Frazier
Fred Titmus
Marco Simoncelli
Gary Mason
Graham Dilley
Mike Doyle
Trevor Bailey
Ginger McCain
Grete Waitz
Martin Webster
Dean Richards
Basil D'Oliveira
Henry Cooper
Gary Speed

References

External links
Official website

Bbc
2011 in British television
2011
2011 in British sport
Bbc